The ' Leader of the Opposition of the Commonwealth of Dominica is the Member of Parliament who leads the Official Opposition in the House of Assembly of Dominica.

The current Leader of the Opposition is Jesma Paul, an independent candidate of the Salisbury constituency, who was sworn in on December 20 2022. The position was previously held by Lennox Linton.

Provision

Chapter IV Section 66 of The Constitution of the Commonwealth of Dominica states:

The House of Assembly did not have a Leader of the Opposition in early 2010, following the results of the 2009 general election.  The leader of the opposition United Workers' Party, Ronald Green, lost his seat, and the three UWP Representatives elected boycotted the House of Assembly. This ended with the swearing in of Hector John as Leader of the Opposition on 19 July 2010.

List of leaders of the opposition

References

Politics of Dominica
Dominica